USS LST-1000 was an  in the United States Navy. Like many of her class, she was not named and is properly referred to by her hull designation.

LST-1000 was laid down on 26 February 1944 at the Boston Navy Yard; launched on 27 March 1944; and commissioned on 14 June 1944.

During World War II LST-1000 was first assigned to the European Theater:
LST-1000 departed New York City to Avonmouth, UK, 25 July 1944 as part of convoy HXM 30, to resupply troops in Normandy and Mont Saint-Michel.
LST-1000 returned to the US and arrived at Norfolk, Virginia 23 October 1944
LST-1000 departed New York City, 29 November 1944 en route to the Asiatic-Pacific Theater where she participated in the assault and occupation of Okinawa Gunto in April 1945

Following World War II LST-1000 performed occupation duty in the Far East and saw service in China until mid-April 1946.

LST-1000 earned one battle star for World War II service.

References

External links 
 

 

LST-542-class tank landing ships
World War II amphibious warfare vessels of the United States
Ships built in Boston
1944 ships